Robert and Henry Pratt were brothers who were the first settlers in central Barnhartvale, British Columbia, Canada. 'Pratt Road', a main residential access, is named after them.

Robert Pratt (1870–1935) settled in Barnhartvale in 1890; in 1894 his brother (1863–1943) acquired adjoining crown land south of Robert's property.

Robert married Helena Todd, daughter of James Todd. 

By the early 1900s Robert Pratt had a highly successful farm with a large apple orchard. Pratt was among the first in the Interior of British Columbia to sell apples commercially, winning a gold medal in 1911 at the International Agricultural Fair in England.

References

 Balf, Mary, "Kamloops: A History of the District Up To 1914, Kamloops Museum Archives, Kamloops, 1969, pp. 123–127
  N379, The Todds and Pratts of Barnhartvale
 Stewart, John, Robert Pratt and Family, The Kamloops Daily News, Friday, December 18, 1987

People from Kamloops
Settlers of Canada